The Gorgas Medal was originally established as an annual award in 1915 by the Medical Reserve Corps Association of New York in honor of Surgeon General William C. Gorgas, U.S. Army. The award was based on a writing competition open to members of the U.S. Army Medical Corps, the U.S. Army Medical Reserve Corps, and to Medical Corps members of other “organized militia”. Surgeon General Gorgas appointed Colonel Charles Richard, Lieutenant Colonel Champe C. McCulloch, Jr., and Major Eugene R. Whitmore, Medical Corps, to form a review board and act as judge and jury for the writing competition. These officers were members of the Army Medical School faculty.

In 1942, the Gorgas Medal was established by Wyeth Laboratories of Philadelphia, Pennsylvania to honor Major General William Crawford Gorgas. The award was to be presented annually for ‘distinguished work in preventative medicine’. The award consisted of a Silver Medal, a scroll, and an honorarium of $500. In 2010, the Association of Military Surgeons of the United States (AMSUS) restructured the awards program and the Gorgas Medal and Prize was no longer awarded. AMSUS took over administering the Gorgas Medal for Wyeth and renamed the award the William Gorgas Preventive Medicine Award. AMSUS is the Society of Federal Health Professionals. The award was given to an individual for 'distinguished work in preventive medicine, clinical application, education or research'. To be eligible for the award, nominees had to be veterinarians, environmental engineers or sanitation engineers, or from other discipline not from other individual professional award categories from any of the five health agencies represented by AMSUS. The criteria for receiving the award required the individual to have demonstrated accomplishments in accordance with the following objectives:
Contributions to the eradication, control and/or prevention of disease, including, but not limited to, development of new vaccines and treatment protocols
Educational endeavors leading to a healthier population
Development of modern biological defense medical countermeasures
Development and identification of emerging technologies that may occur during any phase of medical product development from inception through licensure (Recognition may include the full range of technologies on how new products are manufactured, formulated and administered.)

List of Gorgas Medal Awardees by decade

2000s
2009, Colonel Lisa Keep, United States Army Medical Corps
2008, Lieutenant Colonel Rodney L. Coldren, United States Army Medical Corps
2007, Colonel Ralph L. Erickson, United States Army Medical Corps
2006, Captain Sven E. Rodenbeck, United States Public Health Service
2005, Captain Laurence Reed, United States Public Health Service
2004, Colonel Bonnie L. Smoak, United States Army Medical Corps
2003, Rear Admiral Robert C. Williams, United States Public Health Service
2002, Colonel Raj K. Gupta, United States Army Medical Service Corps 
2001, Colonel Patrick W. Kelley, United States Army Medical Corps
2000, John D. Hamilton, M.D., Veterans Administration

1990s
1999, Captain Frederick Burkle, Jr., MC, United States Naval Reserve
1998, Rear Admiral Douglas B. Kamerow, United States Public Health Service
1997, Colonel Michael W. Benenson, United States Army Medical Corps
1996, Captain Robert N. Hoover, United States Public Health Service
1995, Colonel William H. Bancroft, United States Army Medical Corps
1994, Captain John D. Boice, Jr., United States Public Health Service
1993, Rear Admiral James O. Mason, United States Public Health Service
1992, Captain John Richard Gorham, United States Public Health Service
1991, Captain George James Hill, MC United States Naval Reserve
1990, Colonel Alfred K. Cheng, USAF MC

1980s
1989, Captain Joseph F. Fraumeni, Jr., United States Public Health Service
1988, Lieutenant Colonel Wilbur Kearse Milhous, MSC United States Army
1987, John Donald Millar, M.D., United States Public Health Service
1986, John V. Bennett, M.D., United States Public Health Service
1985, Colonel Llewellyn J. Legters, United States Army Medical Corps Retired
1984, Lieutenant Colonel Ernest T. Takafuji, United States Army Medical Corps
1983, Colonel George D. Lathrop, USAF MC
1983, Lieutenant Colonel William H. Wolfe, USAF MC
1983, Dr. Richard A. Albanese
1982, Captain Robert Lincoln Kaiser, United States Public Health Service
1981, Captain Eugene G. Rudd, United States Army Medical Corps
1980, Commander Richard R. Hooper, MC USN

1970s
1979, Colonel Craig J. Canfield, United States Army Medical Corps
1978, Colonel George D. Lathrop, USAF MC
1977, Robert H. Purcell, M.D., United States Public Health Service
1976, Captain George M. Lawton, MC USN
1975, Colonel Phillip K. Russell, United States Army Medical Corps
1974, Martin D. Young, Sc.D.
1973, Captain Charles W. Ochs, MC USN
1972, Dr. Robert M. Chanock, United States Public Health Service
1971, Malcolm S. Artenstein, M.D., United States Army
1970, Colonel Dan Crozier, United States Army Medical Corps

1960s
1969, Patricia A. Webb, M.D., United States Public Health Service
1968, Samuel W. Simmons, M.D., United States Public Health Service
1967, Captain James R. Kingston, MC USN
1966, Colonel William D. Tigertt, United States Army Medical Corps
1965, Lieutenant Colonel Edward L. Buescher, United States Army Medical Corps
1964, Dr. Harry D. Pratt, United States Public Health Service
1963, Charles C. Shepard, Chief Project Unit, United States Public Health Service
1962, Lieutenant Colonel William S. Gochenour, United States Army Veterinary Corps
1961, Dr. James Shaw (Asst. SG, United States Public Health Service)
1960, Captain David Minard, M.D., Ph.D., Master of Public Health, MC USN

1950s
1959, Colonel Albert J. Glass, United States Army Medical Corps
1958, Lieutenant Commander John H. Ebersole, M.D., MC USN
1957, Colonel John Paul Stapp, USAF MC
1956, Captain Robert S. Poos, MC USN
1955, Colonel Victor A. Byrnes, USAF MC
1954, Dr. G. Robert Coatney, United States Public Health Service
1953, Colonel Douglas B. Kendricks, Jr., United States Army Medical Corps
1953, Captain Lloyd R. Newhouser, MC USN
1952, Brigadier General James Stevens Simmons, United States Army Retired
1951, Rear Admiral C.S. Stephenson, United States Army Retired
1950, Major General Malcolm C. Grow, United States Air Force Retired

1940s
1949, Dental Director H. Trendley Dean, United States Public Health Service
1948, Major General Edgar Erskine Hume, United States Army Medical Corps
1947, Major General Paul R. Hawley, United States Army Retired
1946, Brig. General Raymond A. Kelser, United States Army Retired
1945, Captain L.T. Coggeshall, MC USNR
1944, Commander James J. Sapero, MC USN
1943, Surgeon General Hugh S. Cumming, United States Public Health Service Retired
1942, Rear Admiral E.R. Stitt, United States Navy Retired
1942, Brigadier General Jefferson Randolph Kean, United States Army Retired
1942, Brigadier General Frederick Fuller Russell, United States Army Medical Corps, Reserve

See also

 List of medicine awards

References

External links
 Association of Military Surgeons of the United States

Awards established in 1915
Medicine awards
Awards established in 1942
1915 establishments in New York (state)